The Speaker's State Coach is the oldest of the three great State Coaches of the United Kingdom. Like the Gold State Coach and the Lord Mayor of London's State Coach it is elaborately carved and gilded, and is decorated with allegorical paintings by G. B. Cipriani.

The coach was originally designed for King William III in 1698 by Daniel Marot. William's successor Queen Anne then passed it on to the Speaker of the House of Commons, in whose charge it remains to this day.

It is seldom seen in action except at Coronations, when the Speaker customarily uses it for the short journey from the Palace of Westminster to Westminster Abbey before the service, and then in the carriage procession following the service.

Use in the 20th century 
The coach was used on the following occasions in the last century:
The Coronation of Edward VII
The Coronation of George V
The Silver Jubilee of George V
The Coronation of George VI
The Coronation of Elizabeth II
The Wedding of Charles, Prince of Wales and Lady Diana Spencer

On State occasions such as these, the Speaker is accompanied in the coach by his usual retinue of Secretary, Chaplain and Serjeant-at-Arms, together with the House of Commons Mace, which is positioned so as to be clearly visible from outside. The Speaker's Train-bearer is also accommodated, on a stool in the centre.

A Coachman and two Footmen are employed, in distinctive livery, and the Speaker has the special privilege of being escorted by a single Household Cavalryman, who rides alongside the carriage. Since the Speakership of Mr Shaw-Lefevre the coach has always been pulled by a pair of Whitbread Shire horses (Shaw-Lefevre having been a partner in Messrs Whitbread & Co.).

When not in use, the Speaker's State Coach used to be kept on display at Whitbread's Brewery in Chiswell Street, London EC1. When Whitbread's sold the building, they relinquished their custody of the coach; since then it has occasionally been displayed in Westminster Hall.

On 4 March 2011, Speaker Bercow announced that the coach would go on display at the National Trust’s Arlington Court Carriage Museum in Devon.

Decorative details

Carvings 

The body of the coach is supported by 'naval and military figures'.
The coachman's box rests on two large figures of Plenty, and the footboard on a pair of lions.

Painted panels (by Giovanni Cipriani) 

Nearside door: seated figure of Britannia with assorted women bringing her fruit.
Offside door: King William III, seated, accompanied by figures of Liberty, Fame and Justice. He is being presented with two scrolls inscribed 'Magna Carta' and 'Bill of Rights'.
The other four side panels depict personifications of Literature, Science, Plenty and Architecture respectively.
The back panel depicts William III and Mary II together with Britannia, and a ship in the background.

References

External links 
  - Photo of the Speaker's Coach prepared for the Coronation of Elizabeth II
 Arlington Court and the National Trust Carriage Museum information at the National Trust

1698 works
Coaches (carriage)
Road transport of heads of state
Vehicles of the United Kingdom
William III of England